Lead fluoride may refer to:

Lead(II) fluoride (lead difluoride, plumbous fluoride, PbF2), a white powder
Lead(IV) fluoride (lead tetrafluoride, tetrafluoroplumbane, PbF4), white to beige crystals

Lead compounds